Matsu Daily is a newspaper owned by the government of the Lienchiang County, Fujian Province, Republic of China (Taiwan).

It was founded as Tengpu Daily, a newspaper published to the military on Tengpu Island, to commemorate the victory of Tengpu Battle. Following the later retreat to Matsu, the newspaper continued to be published. Matsu Daily started to be published on 3 September 1957.

The ownership of the newspaper was transferred from the military to the county government in 1992. The online version was launched in 1999.

See also
 Media of Taiwan
 Kinmen Daily News

External links
Official website
Source: Pinyin translated with Cozy Website

Newspapers published in Taiwan
1957 establishments in Taiwan
Matsu Islands
Publications established in 1957